Mizzima News is a Burmese multimedia news organisation. It was established in August 1998 by a group of Burmese journalists in exile in New Delhi. Mizzima is a member of Burma News International, a local news coalition.

Organisation
Mizzima Media Co. Ltd. is a registered Myanmar company. It produces a daily digital Mizzima newspaper in Burmese language, a weekly Mizzima business magazine, weekly television programs – aired by Myanma Radio & Television (MRTV) – and websites in both the Burmese and English language. Additionally, Mizzima media products are also available on various digital platforms such as Android and iPhones.

Awards 
The International Press Institute awarded Mizzima News its Free Media Pioneer award in 2007.

References

External links
 

1998 establishments in Myanmar
Politics of Myanmar
Mass media in Myanmar
News magazines published in Asia
Online magazines published in India
Magazines established in 1998
Magazines published in Delhi
Burmese news websites